In Christian angelology, thrones (pl. θρόνοι; , pl. throni) are a class of angels. According to 1 Peter 3:21–22, Christ had gone to Heaven and "angels and authorities and powers" had been made subject to him.

Pseudo-Dionysius the Areopagite in his work De Coelesti Hierarchia includes the thrones as the third highest of nine levels of angels.

Christian angelology
According to Matthew Bunson, the corresponding order of angels in Judaism is called the abalim or arelim/erelim, but this opinion is far from universal. The Hebrew word erelim is usually not translated "thrones", but rather "valiant ones", "heroes", or "warriors".

Rosemary Ellen Guiley (1996: p. 37) states that:

See also
 List of angels in theology

Notes

References
 Bunson, Matthew. Angels A to Z. New York:Crown Trade Paperbacks, 1996. 
 Gulley, Rosemary Ellen (1996). Encyclopedia of Angels.

External links

Angels in Christianity
Classes of angels